Arachanamakhi (Dargwa: Арачанамахьи) is a rural locality (a selo) in Nizhnemulebkinsky Selsoviet, Sergokalinsky District, Republic of Dagestan, Russia. The population was 189 as of 2010. There is 1 street.

Geography 
It is located 29 km southwest from Sergokala. Tsurmakhi and Ullukimakhi are the nearest rural localities.

Nationalities 
Dargins live there.

References 

Rural localities in Sergokalinsky District